The Taylor Grazing Act of 1934 is a United States federal law that provides for the regulation of grazing on the public lands (excluding Alaska) to improve rangeland conditions and regulate their use.

The law initially permitted  of previously unreserved public lands of the United States to be placed into grazing districts to be administered by the Department of the Interior. As amended, the law now sets no limit on the amount of lands in grazing districts. Currently, there are approximately  inside grazing allotments.

These can be vacant, unappropriated, and unreserved land from public lands, all except for Alaska, national forests, parks, monuments, Indian reservations, railroad grant lands, and revested Coos Bay Wagon Road grant lands. Surrounding land owners may be granted right of passage over these districts.  Permits are given for grazing privileges in the districts.  Also permits can be given to build fences, reservoirs, and other improvements.

The permittees are required to pay a fee, and the permit cannot exceed ten years but is renewable. Permits can be revoked because of severe drought or other natural disasters that deplete grazing lands.

History
During the administration of President Herbert Hoover, it became clear that federal regulation of public land use was needed to address the root causes of the Dust Bowl. Since vast portions were used for livestock grazing, the importance of range management loomed large.

The advocacy of John Francis Deeds, Chief of the Agricultural Division of the Geological Survey and Deputy Director of the Department's Grazing Division, was influential in bringing about the benefits of the Taylor Grazing Act.

Congressman Don B. Colton of Utah introduced a bill to create grazing districts, but the bill failed to pass the US Senate. In 1933, Edward T. Taylor, a Representative from Colorado, reintroduced the Colton bill as the Taylor bill. This bill set up the grazing bureau, or service in the Department of Interior, to administer the range lands. The Grazing Service was merged with the General Land Office in 1946 to form the Bureau of Land Management.

Case studies by Phillip O. Foss on the role of local grazing advisory committees established by the Taylor Grazing Act in regulating the grazing of livestock on federal public lands found that such committees were often dominated by the same ranchers and cattlemen whose activities were supposed to be regulated, raising questions as to whether grazing regulation had been "captured" by the regulated interests.

A 2022 study found the law, which demarcated property rights, led to greater land productivity in large grazing districts in the Western US.

Amendments to 1934 Act
U.S. Congressional amendments to the Grazing Act of 1934.

See also
Range war
Sheep Wars

References

Ruth S. Musgrave, et al. (1998) Taylor Grazing Act, Chapter 4: Statute Summaries, Federal Wildlife and Related Laws Handbook, Rockville, Md.: Government Institutes, 
Citation For Distinguished Service - John Francis Deeds - by Secretary of Interior Julius Albert Krug

External links
 The Taylor Grazing Act, Bureau of Land Management, United States Department of the Interior
 43 USC § 315 & 43 USC § 316, Legal Information Institute, Cornell Law School
 

1934 in law
73rd United States Congress
 
United States federal public land legislation
United States federal agriculture legislation